Bergen og omland is a region in Vestland county, Norway. It consists of the districts Midthordland and Nordhordland. The center is the city of Bergen.

Municipalities 

Askøy, Austevoll, Austrheim, Bergen, Fedje, Fjell, Fusa, Lindås, Masfjorden, Meland, Modalen, Os, Osterøy, Radøy, Samnanger, Sund, Vaksdal, Øygarden. Sometimes, also Tysnes, Kvam, Voss and the district of Sogn are included in the economic region Bergen og omland.

See also 
 Greater Bergen Region
 Trondheim og omland

Geography of Bergen
Geography of Vestland